Lorymodes is a genus of snout moths. It was described by George Hampson in 1917.

Species
 Lorymodes australis Viette, 1960
 Lorymodes digonialis (Hampson, 1906)
 Lorymodes stenopteralis Hampson, 1917

References

Pyralinae
Pyralidae genera